Powerlifting at the 2010 Asian Para Games was held in Asian Games Town Gymnasium, Guangzhou, China from December 13 to 18, 2010.

Medal summary

Medal table

Medalists

Men

Women

References
Powerlifting

2010 Asian Para Games events